The Invisible Man is a solo album by the American Music Club singer/songwriter Mark Eitzel, released by Matador Records in 2001.

It is a more electronic effort by Eitzel, who is known for his stark, acoustic arrangements. Eitzel wrote all of the songs on an acoustic guitar, but finished most of them with a sampler and Pro Tools on his Power Mac G4 in the front room of his house.

Critical reception
No Depression called the album "a real return to form, evoking the ghost of [Eitzel's] former band of arch-miserablists, the American Music Club." The Detroit Metro Times called it a "subdued yet powerful record, confirming Eitzel as a talented musician and one of the best songwriters of his generation."

Track listing
 "The Boy With the Hammer" 	
 "Can You See?" 	
 "Christian Science Reading Room"	
 "Sleep" 	
 "To the Sea" 	
 "Shine" 	
 "Steve I Always Knew" 
 "Bitterness" 	
 "Anything" 	
 Without You 	
 "The Global Sweep of Human History" 	
 "Seeing Eye Dog" 	
 "Proclaim Your Joy"

References

2001 albums
Mark Eitzel albums
Matador Records albums